Spathiphyllum ortgiesii is a flowering plant in the family Araceae, native to southern Mexico. This species is sometimes traded as 'peace lily'

It is a herbaceous perennial plant. The large leaves are oval to lanceolate. The flowers are produced in a spadix, surrounded by a (usually white) spathe.

References

USDA, ARS, Germplasm Resources Information Network. Spathiphyllum ortgiesii in the Germplasm Resources Information Network (GRIN), U.S. Department of Agriculture Agricultural Research Service. Accessed 2017-02-23.

ortgiesii